Tomislav Jotovski (born 27 October 1990) is a Macedonian tennis player.

Jotovski has a career high ATP singles ranking of 510 achieved on 15 June 2015. He also has a career high ATP doubles ranking of 541, achieved on 26 September 2016. 
Jotovski's biggest singles title is 2017 Georgia F2 Futures (CL) with 15,000$ prize money.
Jotovski has also won 6 ITF doubles titles.

Jotovski has represented Macedonia at Davis Cup, where he has a win–loss record of 14–13.

Future and Challenger finals

Singles: 5 (1–4)

Doubles 17 (6–11)

Davis Cup (14 wins, 13 losses)
Jotovski debuted for the Macedonia Davis Cup team in the 2008 season and has played 27 matches in 22 ties. His singles record is 11–10 and his doubles record is 3–3 (14–13 overall).

   indicates the result of the Davis Cup match followed by the score, date, place of event, the zonal classification and its phase, and the court surface.

External links 
 
 
 

1990 births
Living people
Macedonian male tennis players
Sportspeople from Skopje